Dennis Wallace (born 10 July 1962) is a Jamaican sprinter. He competed in the men's 4 × 400 metres relay at the 1984 Summer Olympics.

References

1962 births
Living people
Athletes (track and field) at the 1984 Summer Olympics
Jamaican male sprinters
Olympic athletes of Jamaica
Place of birth missing (living people)